Calidota guzmani is a moth of the family Erebidae. It was described by Carlos Rommel Beutelspacher in 1981. It is found in Mexico.

References

Phaegopterina
Moths described in 1981